Fear Before (formerly known as Fear Before the March of Flames) is an experimental rock  band formed in Aurora, Colorado. As stated on their Alternative Press podcast, their name originates from a Denver Post newspaper headline about the 2002 Hayman fire titled "The Fear Before The March of Flames." They released their debut album Odd How People Shake in 2003 with a re-release in January 2004, second album Art Damage in September 2004, third album The Always Open Mouth in September 2006, and fourth album Fear Before in October 2008. In 2010 the band announced they were going into an indefinite hiatus.

Biography

Odd How People Shake (2002-2003)
In 2002, Fear Before the March of Flames was formed in Aurora, Colorado with vocalist David Marion, guitarist/vocalist Adam Fisher, bassist Michael Madruga, and drummer Brandon Proff. The original members all met at Smoky Hill High School in Aurora. However, Adam is the only Colorado native. The band took their name from a local newspaper headline when wildfires swept through their state. The band drew inspiration from bands such as Botch, Converge and The Blood Brothers in creating their music. Prior to forming Fear Before, Adam, Mike, and Brandon were in a pop-punk band together called thirtysixflip. David was their merchandise guy. After they decided to pursue a more abrasive post-hardcore/mathcore direction, David joined, and Fear Before the March of Flames was born.

The band played their first show on August 1, 2002. In July and October 2002, the band recorded their three-song debut EP with Jason Anderson at Grey Music Recording Company in Thornton, Colorado. The band sold copies of this EP on their early tours, which garnered the attention of Portland based Rise Records. Once signed to Rise, the band released their debut album Odd How People Shake in July 2003. They gained notoriety outside of Colorado from tours with bands such as The Blood Brothers and Hopesfall. However, it was on the tour with the band Bear vs. Shark when they were noticed and then signed to the more prominent Equal Vision Records, who re-released their debut in January 2004. Their debut was primarily in the vein of post-hardcore, featuring a mix of screamed vocals on the part of David Michael Marion and clean singing provided by Adam Rupert Fisher. It is rumoured that every song on the album is based on a movie ("Sarah Goldfarb, Where are Your Manners?", for example, is about Requiem for a Dream).

In concert, the band plays few, if any, songs from their debut. On their website, they explicitly state that they will not play one song in particular from their debut, "On the Brightside, She Could Choke;". However, on October 30, 2007 at a show in Houston, Texas, they played an acoustic set at Warehouse Live that included "On the Brightside." Due to a loss in drummer Clayton Holyoak's family, the band decided to play an acoustic set because they were at a loss of percussion.

On September 5, 2008 at an intimate hometown show in Denver, during their encore, Fear Before asked the audience what song they wanted to hear. Unanimously, the entire audience started to chant for "Brightside". After some hesitation, the band played the song in its original form for the first time since 2003. The band has also played this song twice since this show, once in Anaheim, California, and again in Denver.

Art Damage (2004-2005)
From late July 2004 to mid-August 2004, the band played with Evergreen Terrace and I Killed the Prom Queen on the Radiotakeover Tour. The band also played select dates with Norma Jean in August and October as well. In August, the band recorded a live EP at The Epicentre in San Diego, California, titled Live at the Epicentre, which was released in September.

Their second album, Art Damage, was released on Equal Vision Records in September 2004, and was a marked change in direction for the band. Art Damage featured "a much more straightforward, significantly harder style." Different from the earlier material, FBTMOF changed from the original indie post-hardcore sound to more of a mathcore based sound. The video for the single "Should Have Stayed in the Shallows" was filmed in the same basement as the one used in the film Fight Club and was heavily rotated on MTV2's show Headbanger's Ball.

Through April 2005, the band toured with Underoath and The Chariot. The band also played on the Sounds of the Underground tour on Midwest and Southeast dates.

On October 18, 2005, Immortal Records released the soundtrack for the Masters of Horror television series. Fear Before the March of Flames provided a previously unreleased song, "237", for the soundtrack. The song took its name from the infamous room number from the film The Shining. It was featured in the credits for the Tobe Hooper-directed episode Dance of the Dead.

The Always Open Mouth (2006-2007)
In June 2006, the band played at the 7 Angels 7 Plagues Reunion Show, and in August they played at the Dirt Fest.

Their third studio album, The Always Open Mouth, was released on September 19, 2006. Fischer explains that the title of the album refers to people who act like "An all-knowing super being from another realm sent here to save us all, or be a fucking loud mouth bigot. They are The Always Open Mouth." This album marks a considerably different sound from previous recordings, containing a much more experimental side with more emphasis on antiphony between the lead vocalist Marion, and guitarist/vocalist Fisher, and a considerably lesser amount of screaming. It is described as "boldly experimental and brimming with musical complexity". The band has replied to fan response that found the album to be a large departure from the sound of Art Damage by stating that they "just wanted to do something we hadn't done before."

The first single from the album was the song "Taking Cassandra to the End of the World Party", and a video was also filmed with director David Bell. The song references the Greek legend of Cassandra, a woman who possessed the gift of prophecy, but was cursed by the fact that no one would believe her tellings.

Proff left the band to pursue a teaching career and drummer Clayton "Goose" Holyoak, guitarist Zach "Binks" Hutchings, and guitarist/keyboardist Billy Johnson were added.

From October 2006 to December 2006, the band played with previous tour-mates Norma Jean, and Between the Buried and Me, on the first ever Radio Rebellion Tour. In March 2007, the band played a portion of the Russian Circles Plan Midwest Tour and played one day at the Appalachian Annihilation Festival. That month the band again changed their lineup. They stated that Billy Johnson (touring guitarist) left the band due to personal reasons.

In July/August 2007 the band embarked on their first headlining tour with 65daysofstatic, This Will Destroy You, and Hot Cross as support. For this tour they released a limited edition EP entitled A Little Less Teeth, featuring live sessions, outtakes, and demos.

The band had planned to release a DVD titled Absolute Past, Absolute Future with an estimated release date of Spring 2007. The DVD would cover the band's touring before they recorded The Always Open Mouth and the two months spent in Seattle recording the album. Fear Before the March of Flames explained that the DVD will not be "random live footage from four years [...] followed by random live footage from three years ago". Absolute Past, Absolute Future would be presented in documentary form, telling the history of the band chronologically. However, the footage was lost and the release was scrapped.

Fear Before (2008-2009)
In the January 2008 issue of Alternative Press, the band was featured as having one of the most anticipated albums of the year. The album, titled Fear Before, was recorded in Seattle, WA at Johnny Cab Studios with producer Casey Bates (Gatsbys American Dream, Portugal. The Man, The Fall of Troy) during June and July 2008 and was released October 28, 2008.

The self-titled album marked many changes for the band. This is the first album on which lead vocalist Dave Marion contributed the majority of lyrics. In the past, guitarist and back-up vocalist Adam Fisher had written the majority of the lyrics. In contrast to their previous work, most of Dave's vocals on this album are sung as opposed to screamed. This is the first album to feature current drummer Clayton 'Goose' Holyoak, as well as the first and last album where Zachary 'Binks' Hutchings had a substantial role in the writing of a Fear Before album. He had previously played on The Always Open Mouth but did not contribute to writing. The album features guest vocals by a number of people,  most notably Thomas Erak from The Fall of Troy as well as Zachary Carothers of Portugal. The Man, Robert Smith of Heavy Heavy Low Low, Quentin Smith of Vaux, and Dreu Damian of I Am The Ocean. One of the songs from the album, "Review Our Lives", is a revised version of "Epic Song", which was previously released as a live session on their A Little Less Teeth EP.

In September 2008 they embarked on a headlining tour with Damiera and I Am the Ocean as support. Fear Before also announced on September 9, 2008 that they would be dropping "The March of Flames" from their name, and would from now on be known as simply "Fear Before". The band had considered keeping their full name and simply titling the album Fear Before, but decided against it at the last minute.

In early 2009, Zach Hutchings left the band to join Utah group I Am the Ocean. Adam has stated that Zach left due to some personal and creative tensions, though Zach and the band remain good friends. The band decided to remain a four piece. After Binks' departure, the band supported Alesana on a package tour that spring. In the summer, Fear Before toured Australia for the first time, where their friend Trent Jacobi fell through the roof of a house and was hospitalized. In response to this event, Fear Before posted their discography on Bandcamp.com to raise money to cover hospital bills. Tour and labelmates Circa Survive also released a limited edition 7" featuring b-sides from On Letting Go to raise money for Trent.

After returning from Australia they embarked on what would be their last two headlining tours. The first was in the United States with Oceana and Memphis May Fire as support. The second, titled "The Hunt for Shred October", was across Canada with Baptized in Blood, Trophy Scars and Black Moor from August to September. The band planned to not tour in 2010 and instead stay home and continue work on their fifth full-length. The band's last show before their hiatus began was on December 4, 2009 at the Crabtree Brewing Company in Greeley, Colorado.

Possible fifth album and indefinite hiatus (2010-present)
In January 2011, Adam played his first solo show at the Larimer Lounge in Denver, Colorado. He revealed that the songs he had been writing were not quite right for Fear Before, and later dubbed the project All Human. After playing several local shows in the Denver and Salt Lake areas, he released the first All Human demos online. A 14-track album tentatively titled Catholic Guilt and the Queerest of Thoughts was expected to be released later in the  year, and is notable for featuring original Fear Before drummer Brandon Proff on many of the tracks. After close to 18 months of silence from the band, Adam posted the following message on the band's Facebook, signaling an indefinite hiatus.

"guys. im sorry if you have been left with the feeling that we (fear before the march of flames) have been leading you on making you think were working on music. we are not. as of april 2010 goose david mike and i have not been in the same room together with our instruments. however, until april 2010 i had written quite a few songs for a new fear before the march of flames record with the help of goose. whether or not we will ever release another record is up in the air right now. there is no immediate plan to write/record/ or tour. this has nothing to do with Orbs, Loom, All Human, or any other project goose or i may be a part of. Its just the way things went. 2009 took a very weird turn for us and it kinda left all of us collectively and individually wondering what the hell we were doing. I truly am sorry to everyone who is anxiously awaiting a new record from us. im not saying it will never happen, i just cant say that it will. we appreciate all you as friends and fans have allowed us to do and the second there is any development in fear before world you will be the first to know. please feel free to voice your opinion on the matter and i will respond. just know i truly hate bumming any of you out. it truly wasn't my or our intent for it to come to this. as far as all human goes, that is where i will be directing my creative energy for the time being. i hope you guys will enjoy that for what it is. its not a side project or something to keep me busy until something else comes along. it is the music i feel like making and sharing for right now. love you guys. thank you for your support.  adam"

Three days later he made another statement making it clear the band was not breaking up, saying "friends. do not mistake my previous post for a break up announcement. it was an update letting you know that we are currently inactive and there is no forthcoming record from us as of now. i cannot say what the future holds.-adam"

As of October 20, 2014 the band had alluded on their Facebook to new upcoming material, saying "New songs... No hoax." The band has since updated their Facebook to reflect new material titled "Absolute Future Absolute Past".

Members

Current
David Michael Marion - lead vocals, guitars, programming, production, keyboard (2002-2011);
Adam "Rupert" Fisher - lead guitar, keyboards, programming, piano, percussion, synthesizer, production, strings (2002-2011) (now in Orbs), backing vocals (2008-2011); clean vocals (2002-2008)
Michael Madruga - bass, guitar, backing vocals (2002-2011)
Clayton "Goose" Holyoak - drums, percussion (2006-2011) (Every Time I Die, ex-Norma Jean)

Former
Mat Clouse - rhythm guitar (2002–2003)
Brandon Proff - drums, programming (2002-2006)
Zachary "Binks" Hutchings - rhythm guitar (2006-2009)
Billy Johnson - rhythm guitar, keyboards, programming (2006–2007)

Timeline

Discography

Studio albums

EP
Fear Before the March of Flames (2002) - self-released
Stop All the Downloading (Internet EP) (2005) - Equal Vision Records
A Little Less Teeth (2007) - Equal Vision Records

Live
Live at the Epicentre (2004) - Equal Vision Records

DVD
Absolute Future, Absolute Past DVD - Equal Vision Records
This DVD footage was lost; Adam told the story in the AP Podcast, available on iTunes.

Music videos
"The 20th Century Was Entirely Mine" (Odd How People Shake)
"Should Have Stayed in the Shallows" (Art Damage)
"Taking Cassandra to the End of the World Party" (The Always Open Mouth)
"The Waiting Makes Me Curious" (The Always Open Mouth)
"My (Fucking) Deer Hunter" (The Always Open Mouth)
"Fear Before Doesn't Listen To People Who Don't Like Them" (Fear Before)

Songs on compilations
 Rise 2003 Sampler (Rise Records, date unknown)
Track number unknown: "A Shoreline Perspective"
 Rise 2004 Sampler (Rise Records, May 2004)
Track 3: "Given To Dreams of What Shall Never"
 Take Action! Vol. 4 (Sub City Records, September 2004)
Disc 1, Track 13: "Consequences David, You'll Meet Your Fate In The Styx"
Equal Vision Winter 2004 Sampler (Equal Vision Records, 2004)
Track 3: "The State of Texas vs. Fear Before"
Masters of Horror Soundtrack (Immortal Records, September 2005)
Disc 2, Track 14: "237"
Equal Vision Warped Tour Sampler (Equal Vision Records, 2006)
Track 1: "Lycanthropy"
The Best of Taste of Chaos (Warcon Enterprises, 2006)
Disc 1, Track 17: "Should Have Stayed in the Shallows"
2004 Vans Warped Tour Compilation (MCA Records, 2004)
Disc 2 Track 13: "On the Bright Side, She Could Choke"
Take Action! Vol. 6 Disc 1 (Sub City Records 2007)
"Taking Cassandra to the End of the World Party"

References

External links
 Official website

Musical groups from Denver
Musical groups established in 2002
Musical groups disestablished in 2010
Culture of Aurora, Colorado
Rise Records artists
Equal Vision Records artists
American screamo musical groups
American post-hardcore musical groups
American mathcore musical groups
American emo musical groups
2002 establishments in Colorado
Articles which contain graphical timelines
Metalcore musical groups from Colorado